
Gmina Kąkolewnica is a rural gmina (administrative district) in Radzyń Podlaski County, Lublin Voivodeship, in eastern Poland.

Up to 2010 it was called Gmina Kąkolewnica Wschodnia, and had its seat in the village of Kąkolewnica Wschodnia ("East Kąkolewnica"), which is now part of Kąkolewnica.

Villages
Gmina Kąkolewnica contains the villages and settlements of Brzozowica Duża, Brzozowica Mała, Grabowiec, Jurki, Kąkolewnica, Lipniaki, Miłolas, Mościska, Olszewnica, Polskowola, Sokule, Turów, Wygnanka, Żakowola Poprzeczna, Żakowola Radzyńska, Żakowola Stara and Zosinowo.

Neighbouring gminas
Gmina Kąkolewnica is bordered by the gminas of Drelów, Łuków, Międzyrzec Podlaski, Radzyń Podlaski, Trzebieszów and Ulan-Majorat.

References
 Polish official population figures 2006

Kakolewnica
Radzyń Podlaski County